Erbessa pales is a moth of the family Notodontidae first described by Herbert Druce in 1893. It is found in Ecuador, Brazil, Peru and Bolivia.

The larvae feed on Miconia species.

References

Moths described in 1893
Notodontidae of South America